Brunei competed at the 2022 Commonwealth Games at Birmingham, England from 28 July to 8 August 2022. It was Brunei's 9th appearance at the Games.

Brunei's team consisted of seven athletes (five men and two women) competing in two sports.

Competitors
The following is the list of number of competitors participating at the Games per sport/discipline.

Lawn bowls

Weightlifting

One weightlifter qualified through his position in the IWF Commonwealth Ranking List (as of 9 March 2022).

References

External links
Brunei Darussalam National Olympic Council Official site

Nations at the 2022 Commonwealth Games
2022
2022 in Bruneian sport